
Gmina Niebylec is a rural gmina (administrative district) in Strzyżów County, Subcarpathian Voivodeship, in south-eastern Poland.

Villages
Gmina Niebylec contains the villages and settlements of Baryczka, Blizianka, Gwoździanka, Gwoźnica Dolna, Gwoźnica Górna, Jawornik, Konieczkowa, Lutcza, Małówka, Niebylec and Połomia.

Neighbouring gminas
Gmina Niebylec is bordered by the gminas of Błażowa, Czudec, Domaradz, Korczyna, Lubenia and Strzyżów.

References
Polish official population figures 2006

Niebylec
Strzyżów County